The Roewe RX9 is a mid-size SUV produced by the SAIC under the Roewe brand.

Overview

In August 2022, Roewe expanded its existing representation in the segment of higher class SUVs, presenting a more modern and less conventional alternative to the conservatively styled RX8 presented 4 years earlier. The new flagship model in the range has a more aggressive styling, with a large trapezoidal air intake, narrow headlamps and narrow stripes of LED daytime running lights that cross the lane at an angle. The rear lamps are connected by a narrow light strip, and the gently sloping roofline is crowned with a slanted window. The SUV was designed for optimal aerodynamic conditions, which was helped by the use of retractable handles.

The passenger compartment was designed in accordance with the trends prevailing in the early 20s of the 21st century among Chinese manufacturers. Minimalist design, the use of aluminum and leather trim, and light-textured materials are combined with a large, three-piece display band that runs the entire width of the dashboard. They functioned successively as: digital clocks, a central touch screen of the multimedia system and a display for the passenger. In total, the pane has a diagonal of 47 inches. With three rows of seats, the Roewe RX9 can accommodate 6 to 7 passengers.

The RX9 was built exclusively for the Chinese market. After debuting in August 2022, the Chinese company announced plans in December of the same year to launch sales of the flagship SUV in February 2023 after delays preventing it from meeting the deadline in the third quarter of 2022.

Specifications
The RX9 offers a single four-cylinder turbocharged gasoline engine. With a capacity of 2 litres, it has a maximum power of 234 hp and is equipped with a 9-speed automatic transmission.

References

External links
Official website

RX9
Mid-size sport utility vehicles
Cars introduced in 2022